Anne Scott may refer to:
 Anne Scott (journalist), Scottish broadcast journalist
 Anne Scott, 1st Duchess of Buccleuch, Scottish peeress
 Anne Firor Scott, American historian

See also
 Ann Scott (disambiguation)